Lindsey Archibald is a Scottish former television presenter for the defunct Daybreak, Setanta Sports and Rangers TV.

Originally from Denny, Falkirk Archibald spent four years in radio, including Edinburgh's Radio Forth, where she was a football commentator. In the mid-2000s, Archibald presented the news using her "flat mic" on the now defunct L107. She joined ITV Border from 2005 to 2007 as a broadcast journalist and occasional presenter on the regional news programme, Lookaround (Border News). Until 2012, she was part of Daybreak Scotland, early morning regional news bulletins for Central and Northern Scotland, provided by Macmillan Media.

Archibald is currently group digital director for the Herald Group (Glasgow) Newspapers

References

Women sports announcers
People from Denny, Falkirk
20th-century births
Living people
Year of birth missing (living people)